The 2018 Cork Premier Intermediate Football Championship was the 13th staging of the Cork Premier Intermediate Football Championship since its establishment by the Cork County Board in 2006. The championship began on 8 April 2018 and ended on 1 December 2018.

On 21 October 2018, Fermoy won the championship following an 0-11 to 0-07 defeat of St Michael's in the final at Páirc Uí Chaoimh. It was their first ever championship title.

Results

Round 1

Round 2

Relegation playoffs

Round 3

Quarter-finals

Semi-finals

Final

Championship statistics

Top scorers

Overall

In a single game

References

External link

 2018 PIFC results

Cork Premier Intermediate Football Championship